Zhaoji may refer to the following locations in China:

 Zhaoji, Funan County, Anhui
 Zhaoji, Dengzhou, town in Henan
 Zhaoji, Huaibin County, town in Henan
 Zhaoji, Jiangsu, in Huaiyin District, Huai'an
 Zhaoji Township, Taihe County, Anhui
 Zhaoji, Wulipu in Wulipu, Shayang, Jingmen, Hubei